All Roads Lead to Calvary may refer to:

 All Roads Lead to Calvary (novel), a 1919 novel by Jerome K. Jerome
 All Roads Lead to Calvary (film), a 1921 film adaptation directed by Kenelm Foss